Scarfo is a former UK rock band.

Scarfo may also refer to:
 Nicky Scarfo Jr.  (born 1965), American mobster, son of Nicodemo
 Nicodemo Scarfo (1929-2017), American mobster, father of Nicky, Jr.
 Scarfo Crime Family

Surnames of Italian origin